Nicholas Christian Hopkins (24 February 1944 – 6 September 1994) was an English pianist and organist. Hopkins performed on many popular and enduring British and American rock music recordings from the 1960s to the 1990s, most notably on songs recorded by the Rolling Stones, the Kinks, the Who, the Beatles, the Steve Miller Band, Jefferson Airplane, Rod Stewart, George Harrison, John Lennon, Paul McCartney, Ringo Starr, The Hollies, Cat Stevens, Carly Simon, Harry Nilsson, Joe Walsh, Peter Frampton, Jerry Garcia, Jeff Beck, Joe Cocker, Art Garfunkel, Badfinger, Graham Parker, Gary Moore, and Donovan. He is widely considered to be one of the greatest studio pianists in the history of popular rock music.

Early life
Nicholas Christian Hopkins was born in Perivale, Middlesex, England, on 24 February 1944. He began playing the piano at the age of three. He attended Sudbury Primary School in Perrin Road and Wembley County Grammar School, which now forms part of Alperton Community School, and was initially tutored by a local piano teacher; in his teens he won a scholarship to the Royal Academy of Music in London. He suffered from Crohn's disease for most of his life.

His poor health and repeated surgery later made it difficult for him to tour, and he worked mainly as a session musician for most of his career. Hopkins's studies were interrupted in 1960 when he left school at 16 to become the pianist with Screaming Lord Sutch's Savages until, two years later, he and fellow Savages Bernie Watson, Rick Brown (aka Ricky Fenson) and Carlo Little joined the renowned blues harmonica player Cyril Davies, who had just left Blues Incorporated, and became the Cyril Davies (R&B) All-Stars. Hopkins played piano on their first single, Davies's much-admired theme tune "Country Line Special". 

However, he was forced to leave the All Stars in May 1963 for a series of operations that almost cost him his life and he was bed-ridden for 19 months in his late teenage years. During Hopkins's convalescence Davies died of leukemia and the All Stars disbanded. Hopkins's frail health led him to concentrate on working as a session musician instead of joining bands, although he left his mark performing with a wide variety of famous bands. He quickly became one of London's most in-demand session pianists and performed on many hit recordings from this period.

With the Rolling Stones
Hopkins played with the Rolling Stones on all their studio albums from Between the Buttons in 1967 through until Tattoo You in 1981, except for Some Girls (1978). Among his contributions, he supplied the prominent piano parts on "We Love You" and "She's a Rainbow" (both 1967), "Sympathy for the Devil", "No Expectations", and "Salt of the Earth" (1968), "Gimme Shelter" and "Monkey Man" (1969), "Sway" (1971), "Loving Cup" and "Ventilator Blues" (1972), "Coming Down Again", "Angie", and "Winter" (1973), "Time Waits for No One" (1974), "Fool to Cry" (1976), and "Waiting on a Friend" (recorded 1972, released in 1981). When working with the band during their critical and commercial zenith in the late 1960s and early 1970s, Hopkins tended to be employed on a wide range of slower ballads, uptempo rockers and acoustic material; conversely, longtime de facto Stones keyboardist Ian Stewart only played on traditional major key blues rock numbers of his choice, while Billy Preston often featured on soul- and funk-influenced tunes. Hopkins's work with the Rolling Stones is perhaps most prominent on their 1972 studio album, Exile on Main St., where he contributed in a variety of musical styles.

Along with Ry Cooder, Mick Jagger, Bill Wyman and Charlie Watts, Hopkins released the 1972 album Jamming with Edward! It was recorded in 1969, during the Stones' Let It Bleed sessions, when guitarist Keith Richards was not present in the studio. The eponymous "Edward" was an alias of Nicky Hopkins derived from studio banter with Brian Jones. It was also incorporated into the title of Hopkins's instrumental song "Edward, the Mad Shirt Grinder", recorded with Quicksilver Messenger Service and released on Shady Grove in December 1969. Hopkins also contributed to the Jamming With Edward! cover art.

Hopkins' prodigious talents were well known among his fellow keyboard players and were frequently on display. Small Faces keyboard player Ian McLagan recounted the story of Ian Stewart playing McLagan the album The Original Delaney & Bonnie & Friends, and in particular the track "Ghetto". Both were astonished by the piano work performed by session pianist Leon Russell. Stewart then told McLagan he had played it to Hopkins once, who then promptly sat at the piano and played the entire song perfectly. Stewart's half-serious comment was "that's what I hate about him". McLagan further elaborated "I understood his frustration, as neither of us could compete with Nicky as a piano player. Our talents are our own, but we couldn't just play something that brilliant after hearing it for the first time. He really was annoyingly, incredibly talented".

Hopkins was added to the Rolling Stones touring line-up for the 1971 Good-Bye Britain Tour, as well as the 1972 North American tour and the 1973 Pacific tour. Audio recordings of those tours reveal the band reaching an incredible live peak, with Hopkins dazzling piano work meshing perfectly with the twin guitars of Taylor and Richards.

He contemplated forming his own band with multi-instrumentalist Pete Sears and drummer Prairie Prince around this time but decided against it after the Stones tour. Hopkins failed to make the Rolling Stones' 1973 European tour due to ill health and, aside from a guest appearance in 1978, did not play again with the Stones live on stage.

With the Kinks
Hopkins was invited in 1965 by producer Shel Talmy to record with the Kinks. He recorded four studio albums: The Kink Kontroversy (1965), Face to Face (1966), Something Else by The Kinks (1967) and The Kinks Are the Village Green Preservation Society (1968).

The relationship between Hopkins and the Kinks deteriorated after the release of The Kinks Are the Village Green Preservation Society, however Hopkins maintained that "about seventy percent" of the keyboard work on the album was his and was incensed when Ray Davies apparently credited himself for most of the keyboard playing.  He was also angered that he wasn’t paid for his session work with the group.

Despite Hopkins's grudge against him, Davies spoke positively of his contributions in a New York Times interview in 1995, a few months after Hopkins' death:

Nicky, unlike lesser musicians, didn't try to show off; he would only play when necessary. But he had the ability to turn an ordinary track into a gem – slotting in the right chord at the right time or dropping a set of triplets around the back beat, just enough to make you want to dance. On a ballad, he could sense which notes to wrap around the song without being obtrusive. He managed to give "Days," for instance, a mysterious religious quality without being sentimental or pious.

Nicky and I were hardly bosom buddies. We socialized only on coffee breaks and in between takes. In many ways, I was still in awe of the man who in 1963 had played with the Cyril Davies All Stars on the classic British R & B record, "Country Line Special." I was surprised to learn that Nicky came from Wembley, just outside of London. With his style, he should have been from New Orleans, or Memphis.

... His best work in his short spell with the Kinks was on the album Face to Face. I had written a song called "Session Man," inspired partly by Nicky. Shel Talmy asked Nicky to throw in "something classy" at the beginning of the track. Nicky responded by playing a classical-style harpsichord part. When we recorded "Sunny Afternoon," Shel insisted that Nicky copy my plodding piano style. Other musicians would have been insulted but Nicky seemed to get inside my style and he played exactly as I would have. No ego. Perhaps that was his secret.

With the Who
Hopkins was first invited to join the Who by Shel Talmy in 1965, while recording their debut album My Generation. His trademark licks and fills bounced effortlessly off the rest of the band and he received a rare songwriting co-credit for the riotous instrumental The Ox. Due to the band breaking ties with Shel Talmy he didn't record again with the band until the quirky single Dogs in 1968. However he was front and centre for the Who's Next album in 1971, contributing massively to Song is Over and Getting in Tune. In addition, during those sessions he played on the single Let's See Action as well as Too Much of Anything. His worth and repute among fellow musicians was such that Pete Townshend offered him a full time role in the band, adding "if you would ever like to join a band, we'd love to be considered first".

Hopkins missed the Quadrophenia album, before making a full return in 1975 on The Who by Numbers. He was also a key instrumentalist on the soundtrack for Ken Russell’s 1975 film, Tommy. Hopkins played piano on several tracks and is acknowledged in the album's liner notes for his work on arrangements for most of the songs.

In later years Hopkins always maintained a soft spot for the band, stating they were probably his all time favourite act to work with.

Solo albums and soundtrack work

In 1966, Hopkins released The Revolutionary Piano of Nicky Hopkins, produced by Shel Talmy. His next solo project released was The Tin Man Was a Dreamer in 1973 under the aegis of producer David Briggs, best known for his work with Neil Young and Spirit. Other musicians appearing on the album include George Harrison (credited as "George O'Hara"), Mick Taylor of the Rolling Stones, and Prairie Prince. Re-released by Columbia in 2004, the album features rare Hopkins vocal performances.

His next solo album, entitled No More Changes, was released in 1975. Appearing on the album are Hopkins (lead vocals and all keyboards), David Tedstone (guitars), Michael Kennedy (guitars), Rick Wills (bass), and Eric Dillon (drums and percussion), with back-up vocals from Kathi McDonald, Lea Santo-Robertie, Doug Duffey and Dolly. A third album, Long Journey Home, has remained unreleased. He also released three soundtrack albums in Japan between 1992 and 1993, The Fugitive, Patio and Namiki Family.

Other groups
In 1967, he joined the Jeff Beck Group. Intended as a vehicle for former Yardbirds guitarist Jeff Beck, the band also included vocalist Rod Stewart, bassist Ronnie Wood and drummer Micky Waller. He remained with the ensemble through its dissolution in August 1969, performing on Truth (1968) and Beck-Ola (1969). He also began to record for several San Franciscan groups, including the New Riders of the Purple Sage, the Steve Miller Band and Jefferson Airplane, with whom he recorded the album Volunteers and also performed in the Woodstock Festival. From 1969 to 1970, Hopkins was a full member of Quicksilver Messenger Service, appearing on Shady Grove (1969), Just for Love (1970) and What About Me (1970). In 1975, he contributed to the Solid Silver reunion album as a session musician.

By this point Hopkins was one of Britain's best-known session players, particularly through his work with the Rolling Stones and after playing electric piano on the Beatles' "Revolution". Further raising his profile, he contributed to several Harry Nilsson albums in the early 1970s, including Nilsson Schmilsson and Son of Schmilsson, and recordings by Donovan.

In 1969, Hopkins was a member of the short-lived Sweet Thursday, a quintet comprising Hopkins, Alun Davies (who worked with Cat Stevens), Jon Mark, Harvey Burns and Brian Odgers. The band completed their eponymous debut album; however, the project was doomed from the start. Their American record label, Tetragrammaton Records, abruptly declared bankruptcy (by legend, the same day the album was released) with promotion and a possible tour never happening.

In August 1975, he joined the Jerry Garcia Band, envisaged as a major creative vehicle for the guitarist during the mid-seventies hiatus of the Grateful Dead. His increasing use of alcohol precipitated several erratic live performances, resulting in him leaving the group by mutual agreement after a December 31 appearance. During 1979–1989, he was playing and touring with Los Angeles-based Night, who had a hit with a cover of Walter Egan's "Hot Summer Nights". In addition to recording with the Beatles in 1968, Hopkins worked with each of the four when they went solo. Between 1970 and 1975, he appeared on many projects by John Lennon, George Harrison and Ringo Starr, making key contributions to their critically acclaimed respective solo albums Imagine, Living in the Material World and Ringo. He worked only once with Paul McCartney, on the latter's 1989 album Flowers in the Dirt.

Hopkins also performed with Graham Parker's backing band the Rumour after their keyboardist Bob Andrews left the band.

Later life
Hopkins lived in Mill Valley, California, for several years. During this time he worked with several local bands and continued to record in San Francisco. One of his complaints throughout his career was that he did not receive royalties from any of his recording sessions, because of his status at the time as merely a "hired hand", as opposed to pop stars with agents. He received songwriting credit for his work with the Jeff Beck Group, including an instrumental, "Girl From Mill Valley", on the 1969 album Beck-Ola. 

His precarious health, a consequence of Crohn's disease and its complications, made touring very difficult, limiting him largely to studio work. Only Quicksilver Messenger Service, through its manager Ron Polte, who went to great lengths to treat his musicians fairly, as well as with assent of the band's members, included Hopkins in an ownership stake. Towards the end of his life Hopkins worked as a composer and orchestrator of film scores, with considerable success in Japan.

In the early 1980s, Hopkins credited the Church of Scientology-affiliated Narconon rehabilitation program with curing his drug and alcohol addiction so he ultimately remained a Scientologist for the rest of his life. As a result of his religious affiliation, he contributed to several of L. Ron Hubbard's musical recordings.

In 1993, Hopkins, Joe Walsh, Terry Reid, Rick Rosas, and Phil Jones put together an informal group called The Flew. They played one show at The Coach House in San Juan Capistrano. This was Hopkins's last public performance before his death.

Death

Hopkins died on 6 September 1994, at the age of 50, in Nashville, Tennessee, from complications resulting from intestinal surgery related to his lifelong battle with Crohn's disease. At the time of his death, he was working on his autobiography with Ray Coleman.

Legacy and recognition
Songwriter and musician Julian Dawson collaborated with Hopkins on one recording, the pianist's last, in spring 1994, a few months before his death. After Ray Coleman's death, the connection led to Dawson working on a definitive biography of Hopkins, first published by Random House in German in 2010, followed in 2011 by the English-language version with the title And on Piano ... Nicky Hopkins (a hardback in the UK via Desert Hearts, and a paperback in North America via Backstage Books/Plus One Press).

On 8 September 2018, the Nicky Hopkins "piano" park bench memorial, crowdfunded through PledgeMusic, was unveiled in Perivale Park near Hopkins' birthplace. 

The campaign offered the opportunity for pledgers to have their name inscribed on the bench and contribute towards funding a music scholarship at London's Royal Academy of Music, where Hopkins himself won a scholarship in the 1950s. Names that have pledged in the campaign include Mick Jagger, Keith Richards, Charlie Watts, Ronnie Wood, Bill Wyman, Yoko Ono Lennon, Roger Daltrey, Jimmy Page, Hossam Ramzy, Johnnie Walker and Kenney Jones. A quote about Hopkins by Bob Harris appears on the bench.

On what would have been Hopkins' 75th birthday (24 February 2019), the Nicky Hopkins Scholarship at the Royal Academy of Music was created, and on 19 October 2019, a commemorative plaque on his childhood home, 38 Jordan Road, Perivale, donated by the Ealing Council and Ealing Civic Society, was unveiled.

In 2021, it was announced that a documentary about his life, called The Session Man, was in production.

Discography

Solo albums
The Revolutionary Piano of Nicky Hopkins (1966)
The Tin Man Was a Dreamer (1973)
No More Changes (1975)

Soundtracks
 The Fugitive (1992)
 Patio (1992)
 Namiki Family (1993)

Selected performances and collaborations
with The Rolling Stones 
Their Satanic Majesties Request (1967); 
"We Love You" (1968)
"She's a Rainbow" (1968)
"Sympathy for the Devil" (1968)
"Street Fighting Man" (1968)
"Gimme Shelter" (1969) 
"Monkey Man" (1969) 
"Sway" (1971) 
Exile on Main St. (1972) 
"Angie" (1973) 
"Time Waits for No One" (1974)
"Fool to Cry" (1976) 
"Waiting on a Friend" (recorded 1972, released 1981)

with Jeff Beck
"Morning Dew" (1967) 
Truth (1967) 
"Girl From Mill Valley" on Beck-Ola (1969)

with Joe Cocker 
 I Can Stand a Little Rain (1974)
"You Are So Beautiful" (1974)
 Jamaica Say You Will (1975)

with Art Garfunkel
 Breakaway (1975)
 Lefty (1988)

with George Harrison
 Living in the Material World (1973)
 Dark Horse (1974)
 Extra Texture (Read All About It) (1975)

with Jefferson Airplane 
"Volunteers" (1969), 
"Wooden Ships" (1969), 
"Eskimo Blue Day" (1969) 
"Hey Fredrick" (1969) 
Woodstock Festival set

with The Kinks 
The Kink Kontroversy (1965)
Face to Face (1966) 
Something Else by The Kinks (1967)
The Kinks Are the Village Green Preservation Society (1968)

 with John Lennon 
Imagine (1971) 
"Happy Xmas (War Is Over)" (1971) 
Walls and Bridges album (1974)

with Quicksilver Messenger Service 
Shady Grove (composer of "Edward, the Mad Shirt Grinder") (1969), 
Just for Love (1970) 
What About Me (composer of "Spindrifter") (1970)

with Ringo Starr
 Ringo (1973)
 Goodnight Vienna (1974)

with Rod Stewart
 Foot Loose & Fancy Free (1977)
 Blondes Have More Fun (1978)
 Every Beat of My Heart (1986)

with The Who
My Generation (1965), 
The Song Is Over and Getting in Tune on Who's Next (1971),
Let's See Action (1971) 
The Who by Numbers (1975)

with others 
Gene Clark - various recordings
Amory Kane - various recordings
Cat Stevens - "Matthew and Son" on the album Matthew and Son (1967)
The Easybeats - "Heaven & Hell", and an unreleased album titled Good Times (1967)
The Beatles - "Revolution" (single version) (1968)
The Move - "Hey Grandma", "Mist on a Monday Morning", "Wild Tiger Woman" (all 1968)
 The Raisins - "Sahara", "Under the Plump Pears" (1968)
Brewer & Shipley - Weeds (1969)
Steve Miller Band - "Kow Kow", "Baby's House" (which Hopkins co-wrote with Miller) (1969)
Jackie Lomax - Is This What You Want? (1969)
P. J. Proby - Reflections of Your Face (Amory Kane) from "Three Week Hero" (1969)
The Iveys - "See-Saw Granpa" on the album Maybe Tomorrow (1969)
Donovan - "Barabajagal" (1969), Essence to Essence (1973)
Jamming with Edward (jam session with Ry Cooder, Mick Jagger, Bill Wyman and Charlie Watts (recorded 1969, released 1972)
The Jayhawks - "Two Angels" and "Martin's Song" on the album Hollywood Town Hall (1992)
Carly Simon - No Secrets (1972)
New Riders of the Purple Sage - Powerglide (1972)
Harry Nilsson - Son of Schmilsson (1972)
Marc Bolan - "Jasper C. Debussy" (recorded 1966–67, released 1974)
Martha Reeves - Martha Reeves (1974)
Peter Frampton - Somethin's Happening (1974)
Jerry Garcia Band - Let It Rock: The Jerry Garcia Collection, Vol. 2 (1975), Garcia Live Volume Five (1975)
Art Garfunkel - Breakaway (1975)
Jerry Garcia - Reflections (1976)
Bill Wyman - Stone Alone (1976)
Carole Bayer Sager - Carole Bayer Sager (1977)
Jennifer Warnes - Jennifer Warnes (1977)
Badfinger - Airwaves (1979)
Meat Loaf - "More Than You Deserve" from Dead Ringer (1981)
Ron Wood - 1234 (1981)
Graham Parker - Another Grey Area (1982)
Dusty Springfield - White Heat (1982)
Buzzy Linhart - The Four Sides of Buzzy Linhart (1982, EP)
Carl Wilson - Youngblood (1983)
Belinda Carlisle - Belinda (1986)
Paul McCartney - Flowers in the Dirt (1989)
The Dogs D'Amour - Errol Flynn (1989)
Adam Bomb - New York Times (recorded in 1990, released in 2001)
Spinal Tap - "Rainy Day Sun" on the album Break like the Wind (1991)
Izzy Stradlin -  Izzy Stradlin and the Ju Ju Hounds (1992)
Matthew Sweet - Altered Beast (1993)
Joe Walsh - "Guilty of the Crime" on the album A Future to This Life: Robocop – The Series Soundtrack (1994)

References

External links
 Audio samples of some great Hopkins moments
 A website about Nicky Hopkins
 The official Nicky Hopkins website

1944 births
1994 deaths
English rock keyboardists
English rock pianists
English session musicians
Quicksilver Messenger Service members
Plastic Ono Band members
English expatriates in the United States
People from Harlesden
English organists
British male organists
Fontana Records artists
20th-century British pianists
20th-century English musicians
Steve Miller Band members
All-Stars (band) members
Screaming Lord Sutch and the Savages members
English Scientologists
People with Crohn's disease
Deaths from Crohn's disease
Cliff Bennett and the Rebel Rousers members
Jerry Garcia Band members
Lord Sutch and Heavy Friends members
20th-century British male musicians
People from Perivale
Musicians from London
Alumni of the Royal Academy of Music